Thip Chang or ceremonial name Phraya Thipphachak (พระยาทิพย์จักร) was sovereign of Lampang during a period of sovereignty not subject to Burman, Ayuthian or Lannanese rule. He is regarded as the progenitor of the Dibayachakkradhiwongse dynasty, the forefathers of the bloodline of the Lords of Chet Ton. He was married to Lord Mother Pim Pam Mahathewi (แม่เจ้าปิมปามหาเทวี) of Ban Pa Nat Dam (บ้านป่าหนาดดำ), Ban Ueam (บ้านเอื้อม), and ruled from 1732 to 1759.

Biography 

In 1730, Lampang faced civil war. At the time, Thip Chak had been a hunter, but had spearheaded the group of soldiers that assassinated the ringleader of the rebellion, Thao Maha Yot. This had originally been commanded of the sovereign of Lampang by the Burman Konbaung dynasty. According to the Chronicles of Chiang Mai, he later subdued an uprising in Lamphun, and in his final years ruled his realm on the foundations of Buddhist doctrine.

References 

-Ongsakul, Sarassawadee, History of Lanna, translated by Chitraporn Tanratanakul, Chiang Mai: Silkworm Books, Thai text 2001, English text 2005, 
-The Chiang Mai Chrinicle Ed.2, translated by David K. Wyatt and Aroonrat Wichienkaeo, Chiengmai: Silkworm Books, 1998, 

|-

1759 deaths
Rulers of Lampang
Year of birth unknown
18th-century Thai monarchs
Lan Na royalty